Madanthyar is a small town located in Belthangady taluk of the Dakshina Kannada district of Karnataka state in India.  It is on the route to Mangalore from Belthangady.

Geography
It has an average elevation of 685 metres (2247 feet).

Significance
People from around the district visit Madanthyar to shop, particularly to buy groceries and clothing.
Madanthyar is growing day by day with new infrastructure and locally owned businesses. Well known banks, such as Corporation Bank and the State Bank of India can be found in Madanthyar.

Education
List of educational institutions around Madanthyar
 Sacred Heart College, Madanthyar
 Guardian Angels Higher Primary School, Madanthyar
 Govt. Junior College, Punjalakatte

Public locations
 Sacred Heart community hall
 Sacred heart college indoor sports stadium

Hospitals
 S.D.M.Hospital, Ujire
 L.M.Pinto Hospital, Badyar
 Govt Hospital, Belthangady
 Benaka Hospital, Ujire
 Jyothi Hospital, Laila, Belthangady
 Damodar Hospital, Belthangady 
 Shri Raghavendra Nursing Home, Belthangady 
 Abhaya Hospital, Guruvayanakere
 Padmambha health care, Madhanthyar

Nearby Taluks
Bantwal Taluk
Belthangady Taluk

References 

Cities and towns in Dakshina Kannada district
Villages in Dakshina Kannada district